John Niven (born 1966) is a Scottish author and screenwriter. His books include Kill Your Friends, The Amateurs, and The Second Coming.

Career
Born in Irvine, Ayrshire, Niven read English literature at the University of Glasgow, graduating in 1991 with First Class honours.  For the next ten years, he worked for a variety of record companies, including London Records and Independiente. He left the music industry to write full-time in 2002 and published Music from Big Pink, a book about The Band’s album of the same name, in 2005 (Continuum Press). The book was optioned for the screen by CC Films with a script written by English playwright Jez Butterworth.

Niven's breakthrough novel Kill Your Friends is a satire of the music business, based on his brief career in A&R, during which he passed up the chance to sign Coldplay and Muse. The novel was published by William Heinemann in 2008 to much acclaim, with The Word magazine describing it as "possibly the best British Novel since Trainspotting". It has been translated into seven languages and was a bestseller in Britain and Germany. Niven has since published The Amateurs (2009), The Second Coming (2011), Cold Hands (2012), Straight White Male (2013), The Sunshine Cruise Company (2015) and  Kill 'em All (2018).

He also writes original screenplays with writing partner Nick Ball, the younger brother of British TV presenter Zoë Ball. His journalistic contributions to newspapers and magazines include a monthly column for Q magazine, entitled "London Kills Me". In 2009 Niven wrote a controversial article for The Independent newspaper where he attacked the media's largely complacent coverage of Michael Jackson's death.

In 2005 he co-wrote the lyrics of two songs on James Dean Bradfield's album The Great Western.

Niven co-wrote the screenplay How to Build a Girl, opposite Caitlin Moran, based upon her novel of the same name, directed by Coky Giedroyc.

Niven contributes regularly to Noble Rot Magazine, an independent publication about wine and food, and the Daily Record.

An atheist and a republican, Niven refuses to sing "God Save the Queen" on ideological grounds.

Bibliography
 Music from Big Pink: A Novella (33 1/3) (2005)
 Kill Your Friends (2008)
 The Amateurs (2009)
 The Second Coming (2011)
 Cold Hands (2012)
 Straight White Male  (2013)
 The Sunshine Cruise Company (2015)
 No Good Deed (2017)
 Kill 'Em All — sequel to Kill Your Friends (2018)
 The F*ck-it List (2020)

Filmography
 The Trip (2021) - Writer
 How to Build a Girl - Screenwriter
 Superviszed (2018) - Screenwriter
 Kill Your Friends (2015) - Screenwriter
 Cat Run (2011) - Screenwriter

References

External links 
Author page on Penguin
 https://www.independent.co.uk/arts-entertainment/books/reviews/kill-your-friends-by-john-niven-780982.html
 https://www.theguardian.com/books/2009/jan/31/kill-your-friends-review
Interview in Shotsmag Ezine July 2012

1968 births
Living people
21st-century Scottish novelists
Scottish screenwriters
Scottish male novelists
Alumni of the University of Glasgow
21st-century British male writers
Scottish atheists
21st-century British screenwriters
People from Irvine, North Ayrshire
Scottish republicans